Chóngniǔ or rime doublets are certain pairs of Middle Chinese syllables that are consistently distinguished in rime dictionaries and rime tables, but without a clear indication of the phonological basis of the distinction.

Description 
Rime dictionaries such as the Qieyun and Guangyun divided words by tone and then into rhyme groups. The pronunciation of each homophone group was indicated by a  formula, a pair of characters having respectively the same initial and final sound as the word being described. By systematically analysing the fanqie, it is possible to identify equivalent initial and final spellers, and thus enumerate the initials and finals, but not their phonetic values. Rime tables such as the Yunjing further analysed the syllables distinguished by the rime dictionaries into initial consonant, 'open' or 'closed', divisions (I–IV), broad rhyme class and tone. The closed distinction is generally considered to represent lip rounding.

The interpretation of the divisions has long been the most obscure part of traditional phonology.
The finals implied by the fanqie may be divided into four broad classes based on the initials with which they co-occur.
Because these classes correlate with rows in the rime tables, they are conventionally named divisions I–IV.
Finals of divisions I, II and IV occur only in the corresponding rows of the rime tables, but division-III finals are spread across the second, third and fourth rows.

In most cases the different homophone groups within a Qieyun rhyme group are clearly distinguished by having a different initial or through the open/closed distinction in the rime tables.  Pairs of syllables that are not so distinguished are known as chongniu, and occur only with certain division-III finals and with labial, velar or laryngeal initials.  The distinction is reflected in the rime tables, where these pairs are divided between rows 3 and 4, and their finals are therefore known as chongniu-III and chongniu-IV finals respectively.  The pairs are usually distinguished in fanqie spellings:
 The finals of chongniu-III words are usually rendered with other division-III chongniu words, but sometimes with words with retroflex initials.
 The finals of chongniu-IV words are rendered with other division-IV chongniu words or with words with acute initials.

Some Chinese authors refer to chongniu-III and chongniu-IV finals as types B and A respectively, so as to distinguish chongniu-IV finals, which are still division-III finals, from "pure" division-IV finals unrelated to chongniu.

The Middle Chinese notations of Li Fang-Kuei and William Baxter distinguish the chongniu-IV parts, spelt with both "j" and "i", from chongniu-III parts, spelt with only "j"; without any commitment to pronunciation:

Baxter identifies some other finals that behave like chongniu finals, but do not occur paired within Qieyun rhyme groups:

Reflexes of the distinction 

It is, however, reflected in the choice of Chinese characters to represent Old Japanese syllables in the  system, particularly the / distinction between i1 and i2 after velars and labials. These vowels merged as i in later forms of Japanese. In almost all cases, Old Japanese syllables with i1 were transcribed with chongniu-IV words, while syllables with i2 were transcribed with chongniu-III words or other division-III words.

The distinction is reflected most clearly in some Sino-Vietnamese and Sino-Korean readings:

In Sino-Vietnamese, labial initials have become dentals before division-IV chongniu finals, possibly reflecting an earlier palatal element. Even so, the labial initials of some Chongniu-IV words remained labials in Sino-Vietnamese instead of becoming dentals; for instances: "narrow"  EMCh pjianʼ > Beijing biăn vs. SV biển, "stab, quick"  EMCh *pʰjiawʰ > Beijing piào vs. SV phiếu, "gourd"  EMCh bjiaw > Beijing piáo vs. SV biều, and "cotton"  EMCh. mjian > Beijing mián vs. SV miên. This phenomenon can be explained as resulting from "chronological and possibly also stylistic differences": some words might have been borrowed early, when chongniu-III vs. chongniu-IV distinction did not manifest yet as palatisation in Chinese or could not yet be represented as palatalisation in Vietnamese; others might have been borrowed late, when the distinction had been lost.

Sino-Korean shows a palatal glide where division-IV chongniu finals follow velar or laryngeal initials.

Interpretations 
The nature of the distinction within Middle Chinese is disputed, with some scholars ascribing it to a medial and others to the main vowel.

Most linguists now accept the proposal of Sergei Yakhontov that Middle Chinese syllables in division II had a medial *-r- in Old Chinese. William Baxter, following earlier ideas of Edwin Pulleyblank, suggested that chongniu-III syllables had medials *-rj- in Old Chinese, while their chongniu-IV counterparts had a medial *-j- before a front vowel.  The later revision by Baxter and Laurent Sagart elides the *-j- medial, treating such "Type B" syllables as unmarked, in contrast to "Type A" syllables, which they reconstructed with pharyngealized initials.  In this system, Middle Chinese chongniu-III or chongniu-IV syllables are all Type B syllables, which were distinguished by the presence or absence, respectively, of a medial *-r-  in Old Chinese.

Notes

References

Works cited
 
 
 
 
 
 
 
 
 
 
 

Middle Chinese